William Robinson Howson (March 6, 1883 – June 25, 1952) was a politician, judge, debt collector, soldier, banker, and real estate agent from Alberta, Canada. He served as a member of the Legislative Assembly of Alberta from 1930 to 1936 sitting with the Liberal caucus in opposition. He led the caucus and the party from 1932 to 1936.

Early life
William Robinson Howson was born in Norwood, Ontario on March 6, 1883, to William R. Howson and Anna Johnston. Howson would be educated in Norwood and attend undergraduate school near Peterborough. He worked as a high school teacher in Mathers Corners and in 1906 became a bank manager for the Sovereign Bank of Stirling, and in 1908, the Bank of Montreal.

He moved to Alberta in 1910 and settled eventually settled in Edmonton after stints as a bill collector in Sedgewick, Alberta and as a real estate agent in Calgary. He attended the University of Alberta, receiving a Bachelor of Arts degree in 1915 and a Bachelor of Laws degree in 1916, where he was awarded the gold medal in Law upon graduation. Howson would article with Alexander Grant MacKay and was admitted to the Law Society of Alberta on January 11, 1916.

He served with the Royal Canadian Army in France during World War I from 1916 until the end of the war in 1918 as a Sergeant with the Tank Corps. He returned to the practice of law in Edmonton with Parlee, Freeman, and Howson, and eventually becoming King's Counselor in 1935.

Political career
Howson ran for a seat to the Alberta legislature in the 1930 Alberta provincial election. He stood as a Liberal candidate in the Edmonton electoral district. He won the fourth place seat out of seven to earn his first term in the Legislature.

Howson became leader of the Alberta Liberal Party in 1932 and led it in the 1935 provincial election. The Liberal party despite having success prior to the election enticing two members to cross the floor ended up losing seven seats but keeping official opposition status. Howson held his seat finishing in the top three seats after obtaining the vote threshold on the first count.

Howson resigned his seat and as party leader a year later on March 2, 1936, after being appointed to replace John Boyle on the supreme court.

Judicial career
Howson was appointed by the federal Liberal government Justice Minister Ernest Lapointe to sit on the Alberta Supreme Court Trial Division in 1936, the Appellate Division in 1942, and became chief justice of the trial division in 1944 serving until approximately a month before his death on June 25, 1952.

Howson presided over German prisoner of war trials in Medicine Hat including the infamous case where POW Karl Lehman a suspected sympathizer with Operation Valkyrie was beaten and hanged by four fellow POWs on September 10, 1944. Bruno Perzonowsky, Walter Wolf, Heinrich Busch and Willi Mueller were hanged in Lethbridge, Alberta along with convicted murder Donald Sherman Staley on July 24, 1946, in what would be the largest mass hanging since the North-West Rebellion.

On June 5, 1937, while presiding over the sentencing of convicted arsonist Stanley Blozak Howson would witness Blozak commit suicide by swallowing strychnine in the court room and later die in hospital. Prior to his suicide Blozak would profess his innocence and allege he did not receive a fair trial as Blozak was a Socred and Howson was Liberal, and by committing suicide Blozak would avoid the three-year sentence handed down by Howson.

From 1950 to 1951 Howson would hear the case of Oil City Petroleums v. American Leduc Petroleums, which would become the last appeal to go from Canada to the Judicial Committee of the Privy Council.

References

External links
Legislative Assembly of Alberta Members Listing

William Robinson Howson Personnel Record for the First World War

1883 births
1952 deaths
Leaders of the Alberta Liberal Party
Alberta Liberal Party MLAs
Judges in Alberta
University of Alberta alumni